The Wood Memorial Stakes is an American flat Thoroughbred horse race for three-year-olds held annually in April at Aqueduct Racetrack in Ozone Park, Queens, New York. It is run over a distance of 1 1/8 miles (9 furlongs) on dirt. The Wood Memorial has been run as a Grade II event since 2017. It was a Grade I race from 1974 (when grading was first introduced) to 1994 and again from 2002 to 2016.

The Wood Memorial is one of the major prep races on the Road to the Kentucky Derby. Between 1930 and 2000, eleven winners of the Wood Memorial went on to win the Kentucky Derby (Gallant Fox, Twenty Grand, Johnstown, Count Fleet, Hoop Jr., Assault, Foolish Pleasure, Bold Forbes, Seattle Slew, Pleasant Colony and Fusaichi Pegasus). Four of them also won the Triple Crown. The most famous loser in the Wood Memorial was Secretariat, who finished third in 1973.

The winner of the Wood Memorial has not won the Kentucky Derby since 2000, in part because several became injured in the weeks between the two races. For example, Toby's Corner missed the Derby with lameness in his left hind leg (2011), Eskendereya with a soft tissue injury in his left front leg (2010), I Want Revenge with a ligament injury to his right front ankle (2009) and Buddha with separation of the hoof wall from the laminae of his left front leg (2002).

The race was named to honor Eugene D. Wood, a New York State politician and horse racing enthusiast who had been a founder and past president of the old Jamaica Race Course where the race was run until 1960.

From 1925 to 1939, the Wood Memorial was run over a distance of one mile and seventy yards, then at  miles from 1940 to 1951, after which it was changed to its present  miles. All entrants currently carry a weight of 123 lb.

The race was run in two divisions in 1944, 1945, 1947, 1974, and 1983.

Records
In 2005, Bellamy Road set a new stakes record of 1:47.16 at the  mile distance in winning by  lengths for his owner, George Steinbrenner.

Most wins by a jockey:
 9 – Eddie Arcaro (1944, 1945, 1947 (2), 1949, 1950, 1956, 1957, 1958)

Most wins by a trainer:
 7 – "Sunny Jim" Fitzsimmons (1930, 1936, 1937, 1938, 1939, 1955, 1957)

Most wins by an owner:
 4 – Greentree Stable (1927, 1931, 1944, 1963)
 4 – Wheatley Stable (1928, 1936, 1937, 1957)
 4 – Belair Stable (1930, 1938, 1939, 1955)
 4 – Cornelius Vanderbilt Whitney (1935, 1945, 1947, 1956)

Winners

Notes: 
 In 1956, Golf Ace won but was disqualified and placed 2nd. 
In 1962, Admiral's Voyage and Sunrise County finished in a dead heat. However, Sunrise County, was disqualified and placed 2nd. 
Leroy S. (1984), Cahill Road (1991), Irgun (1994), Coronado's Quest (1998), Buddha (2002). I Want Revenge (2009), Eskendereya (2010), and Toby's Corner (2011) are recent horses to win the Wood Memorial Stakes, but not run in the Kentucky Derby.

See also
Wood Memorial Stakes "top three finishers" and starters

References

 History of the Wood Memorial Stakes at the NYRA

External links
Ten Things You Should Know About the Wood Memorial at Hello Race Fans!

1925 establishments in New York City
Horse races in New York City
Aqueduct Racetrack
Jamaica Race Course
Flat horse races for three-year-olds
Triple Crown Prep Races
Grade 2 stakes races in the United States
Graded stakes races in the United States
Sports competitions in New York City
Recurring sporting events established in 1925